

Events

Pre-1600
1244 – Pope Innocent IV arrives at Lyon for the First Council of Lyon.
1409 – The University of Leipzig opens.

1601–1900
1697 – St Paul's Cathedral, rebuilt to the design of Sir Christopher Wren following the Great Fire of London, is consecrated.
1763 – Dedication of the Touro Synagogue, in Newport, Rhode Island, the first synagogue in what will become the United States.
1766 – Swedish parliament approves the Swedish Freedom of the Press Act and implements it as a ground law, thus being first in the world with freedom of speech.  
1804 – At Notre Dame Cathedral in Paris, Napoleon Bonaparte crowns himself Emperor of the French.
1805 – War of the Third Coalition: Battle of Austerlitz: French troops under Napoleon decisively defeat a joint Russo-Austrian force.
1823 – Monroe Doctrine: In a State of the Union message, U.S. President James Monroe proclaims American neutrality in future European conflicts, and warns European powers not to interfere in the Americas.
1845 – Manifest Destiny: In a State of the Union message, U.S. President James K. Polk proposes that the United States should aggressively expand into the West.
1848 – Franz Joseph I becomes Emperor of Austria.
1851 – French President Louis-Napoléon Bonaparte overthrows the Second Republic.
1852 – Louis-Napoléon Bonaparte becomes Emperor of the French as Napoleon III.
1859 – Militant abolitionist leader John Brown is hanged for his October 16 raid on Harpers Ferry, West Virginia.
1865 – Alabama ratifies the 13th Amendment to the U.S. Constitution, followed by North Carolina, then Georgia; U.S. slaves were legally free within two weeks.
1867 – At Tremont Temple in Boston, British author Charles Dickens gives his first public reading in the United States.
1899 – Philippine–American War: The Battle of Tirad Pass, known as the "Filipino Thermopylae", is fought.

1901–present
1908 – Puyi becomes Emperor of China at the age of two.
1917 – World War I: Russia and the Central Powers sign an armistice at Brest-Litovsk, and peace talks leading to the Treaty of Brest-Litovsk begin.
1927 – Following 19 years of Ford Model T production, the Ford Motor Company unveils the Ford Model A as its new automobile.
1930 – Great Depression: In a State of the Union message, U.S. President Herbert Hoover proposes a $150 million public works program to help generate jobs and stimulate the economy.
1939 – New York City's LaGuardia Airport opens.
1942 – World War II: During the Manhattan Project, a team led by Enrico Fermi initiates the first artificial self-sustaining nuclear chain reaction.
1943 – World War II: A Luftwaffe bombing raid on the harbour of Bari, Italy, sinks numerous cargo and transport ships, including the American , which is carrying a stockpile of mustard gas.
1947 – Jerusalem Riots of 1947: Arabs riot in Jerusalem in response to the United Nations Partition Plan for Palestine.
1949 – Convention for the Suppression of the Traffic in Persons and of the Exploitation of the Prostitution of Others is adopted.
1950 – Korean War: The Battle of the Ch'ongch'on River ends with a decisive Chinese victory and UN forces are completely expelled from North Korea.
1954 – Cold War: The United States Senate votes 65 to 22 to censure Joseph McCarthy for "conduct that tends to bring the Senate into dishonor and disrepute".
  1954   – The Sino-American Mutual Defense Treaty, between the United States and Taiwan, is signed in Washington, D.C.
1956 – The Granma reaches the shores of Cuba's Oriente Province. Fidel Castro, Che Guevara and 80 other members of the 26th of July Movement disembark to initiate the Cuban Revolution.
1957 – United Nations Security Council Resolution 126 relating to the Kashmir conflict is adopted.
1961 – In a nationally broadcast speech, Cuban leader Fidel Castro declares that he is a Marxist–Leninist and that Cuba will adopt Communism.
1962 – Vietnam War: After a trip to Vietnam at the request of U.S. President John F. Kennedy, U.S. Senate Majority Leader Mike Mansfield becomes the first American official to comment adversely on the war's progress.
1970 – The United States Environmental Protection Agency begins operations.
1971 – Abu Dhabi, Ajman, Fujairah, Sharjah, Dubai, and Umm al-Quwain form the United Arab Emirates.
1975 – Laotian Civil War: The Pathet Lao seizes the Laotian capital of Vientiane, forces the abdication of King Sisavang Vatthana, and proclaims the Lao People's Democratic Republic.
1976 – Fidel Castro becomes President of Cuba, replacing Osvaldo Dorticós Torrado.
1980 – Salvadoran Civil War: Four American missionaries are raped and murdered by a death squad.
1982 – At the University of Utah, Barney Clark becomes the first person to receive a permanent artificial heart.
1988 – Benazir Bhutto is sworn in as Prime Minister of Pakistan, becoming the first woman to head the government of a Muslim-majority state.
1989 – The Peace Agreement of Hat Yai is signed and ratified by the Malayan Communist Party (MCP) and the governments of Malaysia and Thailand, ending the over two-decade-long communist insurgency in Malaysia.
1991 – Canada and Poland become the first nations to recognize the independence of Ukraine from the Soviet Union.
1993 – Colombian drug lord Pablo Escobar is shot and killed in Medellín.
  1993   – Space Shuttle program: STS-61: NASA launches the Space Shuttle Endeavour on a mission to repair the Hubble Space Telescope.
1999 – The United Kingdom devolves political power in Northern Ireland to the Northern Ireland Executive following the Good Friday Agreement.
2001 – Enron files for Chapter 11 bankruptcy.
2015 – San Bernardino attack: Syed Rizwan Farook and Tashfeen Malik kill 14 people and wound 22 at the Inland Regional Center in San Bernardino, California.
2016 – Thirty-six people die in a fire at a converted Oakland, California, warehouse serving as an artist collective.
2020 – Cannabis is removed from the list of most dangerous drugs of the international drug control treaty by the UN Commission on Narcotic Drugs.

Births

Pre-1600
 503 – Emperor Jianwen of Liang, emperor of the Chinese Liang dynasty (d. 551) 
1501 – Queen Munjeong, Korean queen (d. 1565)
1578 – Agostino Agazzari, Italian composer and theorist (d. 1641)
1599 – Thomas Bruce, 1st Earl of Elgin, Scottish nobleman (d. 1663)

1601–1900
1629 – Wilhelm Egon von Fürstenberg, Catholic cardinal (d. 1704)
1694 – William Shirley, English-American lawyer and politician, Governor of the Province of Massachusetts Bay (d. 1771)
1703 – Ferdinand Konščak, Croatian missionary and explorer (d. 1759)
1738 – Richard Montgomery, Irish-American general (d. 1775)
1754 – William Cooper, American judge and politician, founded Cooperstown, New York (d. 1809)
1759 – James Edward Smith, English botanist and mycologist, founded the Linnean Society (d. 1828) 
1760 – John Breckinridge, American soldier, lawyer, and politician, 5th United States Attorney General (d. 1806)
  1760   – Joseph Graetz, German organist, composer, and educator (d. 1826)
1798 – António Luís de Seabra, 1st Viscount of Seabra, Portuguese magistrate and politician (d. 1895)
1810 – Henry Yesler, American businessman and politician, 7th Mayor of Seattle (d. 1892)
1811 – Jean-Charles Chapais, Canadian farmer and politician, 1st Canadian Minister of Agriculture (d. 1885)
1817 – Heinrich von Sybel, German historian, academic, and politician (d. 1895)
1825 – Pedro II of Brazil (d. 1891)
1827 – William Burges, English architect and designer (d. 1881)
1846 – Pierre Waldeck-Rousseau, French lawyer and politician, 68th Prime Minister of France (d. 1904)
1847 – Deacon White, American baseball player and manager (d. 1939)
1859 – Georges Seurat, French painter (d. 1891)
1860 – Charles Studd, England cricketer and missionary (d. 1931)
1863 – Charles Edward Ringling, American businessman, co-founded the Ringling Brothers Circus (d. 1926)
1866 – Harry Burleigh, American singer-songwriter (d. 1949)
1876 – Yusuf Akçura, Tatar-Turkish activist and ideologue of Turanism (d. 1935)
1884 – Erima Harvey Northcroft, New Zealand soldier, lawyer, and judge (d. 1953)
  1884   – Yahya Kemal Beyatlı, Turkish poet and author (d. 1958)
1885 – George Minot, American physician and academic, Nobel Prize laureate (d. 1950)
1891 – Otto Dix, German painter and illustrator (d. 1969)
  1891   – Charles H. Wesley, American historian and author (d. 1987)
1894 – Warren William, American actor (d. 1948)
1895 – Harriet Cohen, English pianist (d. 1967)
1897 – Ivan Bagramyan, Russian general (d. 1982)
  1897   – Rewi Alley, New Zealand writer and political activist (d. 1987)
1898 – Indra Lal Roy, Indian lieutenant and first Indian fighter aircraft pilot (d. 1918)
1899 – John Barbirolli, English cellist and conductor (d. 1970)
  1899   – John Cobb, English race car driver and pilot (d. 1952)
  1899   – Ray Morehart, American baseball player (d. 1989)
1900 – Elisa Godínez Gómez de Batista, former First Lady of Cuba (d. 1993)
  1900   – Herta Hammerbacher, German landscape architect and professor (d. 1985)

1901–present
1901 – Raimundo Orsi, Argentinian-Italian footballer (d. 1986)
1906 – Peter Carl Goldmark, Hungarian-American engineer (d. 1977)
1909 – Arvo Askola, Finnish runner (d. 1975)
  1909   – Walenty Kłyszejko, Estonian–Polish basketball player and coach (d. 1987)
  1909   – Joseph P. Lash, American activist and author (d. 1987)
1910 – Russell Lynes, American photographer, historian, and author (d. 1991)
  1910   – Taisto Mäki, Finnish runner (d. 1979)
1912 – George Emmett, English cricketer and coach (d. 1976)
1913 – Marc Platt, American actor, singer, and dancer (d. 2014)
1914 – Bill Erwin, American actor (d. 2010)
  1914   – Adolph Green, American playwright and composer (d. 2002)
1915 – Takahito, Prince Mikasa of Japan (d. 2016)
1916 – Howard Finster, American minister and painter (d. 2001)
1917 – Sylvia Syms, American singer (d. 1992)
1921 – Carlo Furno, Italian cardinal (d. 2015)
1922 – Iakovos Kambanelis, Greek author, poet, and screenwriter (d. 2011)
1923 – Maria Callas, American-Greek soprano and actress (d. 1977)
1924 – Jonathan Frid, Canadian actor (d. 2012)
  1924   – Alexander Haig, American general and politician, 59th United States Secretary of State (d. 2010)
  1924   – Else Marie Pade, Danish composer (d. 2016)
  1924   – Vilgot Sjöman, Swedish actor, director, producer, and screenwriter (d. 2006)
1925 – Julie Harris, American actress (d. 2013)
1928 – Guy Bourdin, French photographer (d. 1991)
1929 – Dan Jenkins, American journalist and author (d. 2019)
  1929   – Leon Litwack, American historian and author (d. 2021)
1930 – Gary Becker, American economist and academic, Nobel Prize laureate (d. 2014)
  1930   – David Piper, English race car driver
1931 – Nigel Calder, English journalist, author, and screenwriter (d. 2014)
  1931   – Masaaki Hatsumi, Japanese martial artist and educator, founded Bujinkan
  1931   – Wynton Kelly, American pianist and composer (d. 1971)
  1931   – Edwin Meese, American lawyer, 75th United States Attorney General
  1931   – Gareth Wigan, British film studio executive (d. 2010)
1933 – Peter Robin Harding, English marshal and pilot (d. 2021)
  1933   – Mike Larrabee, American sprinter and educator (d. 2003)
1934 – Tarcisio Bertone, Italian cardinal
  1934   – Andre Rodgers, Bahamian baseball player (d. 2004)
1935 – David Hackett Fischer, American historian, author, and academic
1937 – Manohar Joshi, Indian lawyer and politician, 15th Chief Minister of Maharashtra
1939 – Yael Dayan, Israeli journalist, author, and politician
  1939   – Francis Fox, Canadian lawyer and politician, 48th Secretary of State for Canada
  1939   – Harry Reid, American lawyer and politician, 25th Lieutenant Governor of Nevada (d. 2021) 
1940 – Willie Brown, American football player, coach, and manager (d. 2019)
1941 – Mike England, Welsh footballer and manager
  1941   – Tom McGuinness, English guitarist, songwriter, author, and producer
1942 – Anna G. Jónasdóttir, Icelandic political scientist and academic
1943 – Wayne Allard, American veterinarian and politician
1944 – Ibrahim Rugova, Kosovan journalist and politician, 1st President of Kosovo (d. 2006)
  1944   – Dionysis Savvopoulos, Greek singer-songwriter
  1944   – Botho Strauß, German author and playwright
1945 – Penelope Spheeris, American director, producer, and screenwriter
  1945   – Alan Thomson, Australian cricketer
1946 – John Banks, New Zealand businessman and politician, 38th Mayor of Auckland City
  1946   – Pedro Borbón, Dominican-American baseball player (d. 2012)
  1946   – David Macaulay, English-American author and illustrator
  1946   – Gianni Versace, Italian fashion designer, founded Versace (d. 1997)
1947 – Isaac Bitton, Moroccan-French drummer and songwriter 
  1947   – Tommy Jenkins, English footballer and manager
  1947   – Ivan Atanassov Petrov, Bulgarian neurologist and author
1948 – Elizabeth Berg, American nurse and author
  1948   – T. Coraghessan Boyle, American novelist and short story writer
  1948   – Patricia Hewitt, Australian-English educator and politician, English Secretary of State for Health
  1948   – Toninho Horta, Brazilian guitarist and composer
  1948   – Antonín Panenka, Czech footballer 
1950 – John Wesley Ryles, American country music singer-songwriter and guitarist 
  1950   – Amin Saikal, Afghan-Australian political scientist and academic
  1950   – Benjamin Stora, Algerian-French historian and author
  1950   – Paul Watson, Canadian activist, founded the Sea Shepherd Conservation Society
1952 – Carol Shea-Porter, American social worker, academic, and politician
1954 – Dan Butler, American actor, director, and screenwriter
1956 – Steven Bauer, Cuban-American actor and producer
1957 – Dagfinn Høybråten, Norwegian political scientist and politician, Norwegian Minister of Health
1958 – Andrew George, English politician
  1958   – Vladimir Parfenovich, Belarusian canoe racer and politician
  1958   – George Saunders, American short story writer and essayist
1959 – Kelefa Diallo, Guinean general (d. 2013)
1960 – Peter Blakeley, Australian singer-songwriter and guitarist
  1960   – Razzle, English rock drummer (d. 1984)
  1960   – Rick Savage, English singer-songwriter and bass player 
  1960   – Silk Smitha, Indian film actress
1962 – John Dyegh, Nigerian businessman and politician
1963 – Brendan Coyle, English actor
  1963   – Ann Patchett, American author
  1963   – Rich Sutter, Canadian ice hockey player and scout
  1963   – Ron Sutter, Canadian ice hockey player and coach
1965 – Shane Flanagan, Australian rugby league player and coach
1966 – Philippe Etchebest, French chef and television host
  1966   – Jinsei Shinzaki, Japanese wrestler and promoter, co-founded Sendai Girls' Pro Wrestling
1967 – Mary Creagh, English scholar and politician, Shadow Secretary of State for Transport
1968 – David Batty, English footballer
  1968   – Darryl Kile, American baseball player (d. 2002)
  1968   – Lucy Liu, American actress and producer
  1968   – Nate Mendel, American singer-songwriter and bass player 
  1968   – Rena Sofer, American actress
1969 – Ulrika Bergquist, Swedish journalist
  1969   – Chris Kiwomya, English footballer
  1969   – Pavel Loskutov, Estonian runner
  1969   – Tanya Plibersek, Australian journalist and politician, 45th Australian Minister of Health
1970 – Maksim Tarasov, Russian pole vaulter
  1970   – Treach, American rapper and actor
1971 – Wilson Jermaine Heredia, American actor and singer
  1971   – Rachel McQuillan, Australian tennis player
  1971   – Jüri Reinvere, Estonian-German composer and poet
  1971   – Francesco Toldo, Italian footballer
  1971   – Mine Yoshizaki, Japanese illustrator
1972 – Sergejs Žoltoks, Latvian ice hockey player (d. 2004)
1973 – Graham Kavanagh, Irish footballer and manager
  1973   – Monica Seles, Serbian-American tennis player
  1973   – Lee Steele, English footballer
  1973   – Jan Ullrich, German cyclist
1975 – Mark Kotsay, American baseball player
1976 – Eddy Garabito, Dominican baseball player
  1976   – Masafumi Gotoh, Japanese singer-songwriter, guitarist, and producer 
1977 – Siyabonga Nomvethe, South African footballer
1978 – Jarron Collins, American basketball player and coach
  1978   – Jason Collins, American basketball player
  1978   – Nelly Furtado, Canadian singer-songwriter, producer, and actress
  1978   – Luigi Malafronte, Italian footballer
  1978   – Peter Moylan, Australian baseball player
  1978   – Maëlle Ricker, Canadian snowboarder
  1978   – David Rivas, Spanish footballer
  1978   – Andrew Ryan, Australian rugby league player and sportscaster
  1978   – Christopher Wolstenholme, English singer-songwriter and bass player 
1979 – Yvonne Catterfeld, German singer-songwriter and actress
  1979   – Michael McIndoe, Scottish footballer
  1979   – Abdul Razzaq, Pakistani cricketer
1980 – Adam Kreek, Canadian rower
  1980   – Darryn Randall, South African cricketer (d. 2013)
1981 – Maria Ferekidi, Greek canoe racer
  1981   – Eric Jungmann, American actor
  1981   – Danijel Pranjić, Croatian footballer
  1981   – Britney Spears, American singer-songwriter, dancer, and actress
1982 – Christos Karipidis, Greek footballer
  1982   – Matt Ware, American football player
1983 – Chris Burke, Scottish footballer
  1983   – Bibiana Candelas, Mexican volleyball player
  1983   – Jaime Durán, Mexican footballer 
  1983   – Jana Kramer, American actress and singer
  1983   – Aaron Rodgers, American football player
  1983   – Daniela Ruah, Portuguese-American actress
1984 – Péter Máté, Hungarian footballer
1985 – Amaury Leveaux, French swimmer
  1985   – Dorell Wright, American basketball player
1986 – Song Ha-yoon, South Korean actress
  1986   – Claudiu Keșerü, Romanian footballer
  1986   – Tal Wilkenfeld, Australian bass player and composer
1988 – Alfred Enoch, English actor
  1988   – Stephen McGinn, Scottish footballer
1989 – Etta Bond, English singer-songwriter
  1989   – Matteo Darmian, Italian footballer
  1989   – Cassie Steele, Canadian singer-songwriter and actress
1990 – Emmanuel Agyemang-Badu, Ghanaian footballer
  1990   – Gastón Ramírez, Uruguayan footballer
1991 – Chloé Dufour-Lapointe, Canadian skier
  1991   – Charlie Puth, American singer-songwriter and pianist
1993 – Haruka Ishida, Japanese singer and actress 
  1993   – Kostas Stafylidis, Greek footballer
1994 – Fumika Shimizu, Japanese actress and model
  1994   – Tomokaze Yūta, Japanese sumo wrestler
1995 – Uladzislau Hancharou, Belarusian trampolinist
  1995   – Inori Minase, Japanese actress, voice actress and singer
1998 – Juice WRLD, American rapper, singer and songwriter (d. 2019)
  1998   – Anna Kalinskaya, Russian tennis player

Deaths

Pre-1600
 537 – Pope Silverius
 930 – Ma Yin, Chinese warlord, king of Chu (Ten Kingdoms) (b. 853)
 949 – Odo of Wetterau, German nobleman 
1022 – Elvira Menéndez, queen of Alfonso V of Castile (b. 996)
1255 – Muhammad III of Alamut, Nizari Ismaili Imam
1340 – Geoffrey le Scrope, Chief Justice of King Edward III of England
1348 – Emperor Hanazono of Japan (b. 1297)
1381 – John of Ruusbroec, Flemish priest and mystic (b. 1293)
1455 – Isabel of Coimbra, queen of Portugal (b. 1432)
1463 – Albert VI, Archduke of Austria (b. 1418)
1469 – Piero di Cosimo de' Medici, Italian banker and politician (b. 1416)
1510 – Muhammad Shaybani, Khan of Bukhara (b. 1451)
1515 – Gonzalo Fernández de Córdoba, Spanish general (b. 1453)
1547 – Hernán Cortés, Spanish general and explorer (b. 1485)
1594 – Gerardus Mercator, Flemish mathematician, cartographer, and philosopher (b. 1512)

1601–1900
1615 – Louis des Balbes de Berton de Crillon, French general (b. 1541)
1665 – Catherine de Vivonne, marquise de Rambouillet, French author (b. 1588)
1694 – Pierre Puget, French painter, sculptor, and architect (b. 1622)
1719 – Pasquier Quesnel, French theologian and author (b. 1634)
1723 – Philippe II, Duke of Orléans (b. 1674)
1726 – Samuel Penhallow, English-American historian and author (b. 1665)
1747 – Vincent Bourne, English poet and scholar (b. 1695)
1748 – Charles Seymour, 6th Duke of Somerset, English politician, Lord President of the Council (b. 1662)
1774 – Johann Friedrich Agricola, German organist and composer (b. 1720)
1814 – Marquis de Sade, French philosopher, author, and politician (b. 1740)
1844 – Eustachy Erazm Sanguszko, Polish general and politician (b. 1768)
1849 – Adelaide of Saxe-Meiningen (b. 1792)
1859 – John Brown, American abolitionist (b. 1800)
1881 – Jenny von Westphalen, German author (b. 1814)
1885 – Allen Wright, Principal chief of the Choctaw Nation (1866-1870); proposed the name "Oklahoma", from Choctaw words okra and umma, meaning "Territory of the Red People." (b. 1826)
1888 – Namık Kemal, Turkish journalist, poet, and playwright (b. 1840)
1892 – Jay Gould, American businessman and financier (b. 1836)
1899 – Gregorio del Pilar, Filipino general and politician, 1st Governor of Bulacan (b. 1875)

1901–present
1918 – Edmond Rostand, French poet and playwright (b. 1868)
1924 – Kazimieras Būga, Lithuanian linguist and philologist (b. 1879)
1927 – Paul Heinrich von Groth, German scientist who systematically classified minerals and founded the journal Zeitschrift für Krystallographie und Mineralogie (b. 1843)
1931 – Vincent d'Indy, French composer and educator (b. 1851)
1936 – John Ringling, American businessman, co-founded Ringling Brothers Circus (b. 1866)
1943 – Nordahl Grieg, Norwegian journalist and author (b. 1902)
1944 – Josef Lhévinne, Russian pianist and educator (b. 1874)
  1944   – Filippo Tommaso Marinetti, Egyptian-Italian poet and composer (b. 1876)
  1944   – Eiji Sawamura, Japanese baseball player and soldier (b. 1917)
1950 – Dinu Lipatti, Romanian pianist and composer (b. 1917)
1953 – Reginald Baker, Australian rugby player (b. 1884)
  1953   – Trần Trọng Kim, Vietnamese historian, scholar, and politician, Prime Minister of Vietnam (b. 1883)
1957 – Harrison Ford, American actor (b. 1884)
  1957   – Manfred Sakel, Ukrainian-American neurophysiologist and psychiatrist (b. 1902)
1966 – L. E. J. Brouwer, Dutch mathematician and philosopher (b. 1881)
  1966   – Giles Cooper, Irish author, playwright, and screenwriter (b. 1918)
1967 – Francis Spellman, American cardinal (b. 1889).
1969 – José María Arguedas, Peruvian anthropologist, author, and poet (b. 1911)
  1969   – Kliment Voroshilov, Ukrainian-Russian marshal and politician, 3rd Head of State of The Soviet Union (b. 1881)
1974 – Sylvi Kekkonen, Finnish writer and wife of President of Finland Urho Kekkonen (b. 1900)
  1974   – Max Weber, Swiss lawyer and politician (b. 1897)
1976 – Danny Murtaugh, American baseball player and manager (b. 1917)
1980 – Chaudhry Muhammad Ali, Indian-Pakistani lawyer and politician, 4th Prime Minister of Pakistan (b. 1905)
  1980   – Romain Gary, Lithuanian-French author, director, and screenwriter (b. 1914)
1981 – Wallace Harrison, American architect, co-founded Harrison & Abramovitz (b. 1895)
1982 – Marty Feldman, English actor and comedian (b. 1933)
  1982   – Giovanni Ferrari, Italian footballer and manager (b. 1907)
1983 – Fifi D'Orsay, Canadian-American actress and singer (b. 1904)
1985 – Philip Larkin, English poet, author, and librarian (b. 1922)
1986 – Desi Arnaz, Cuban-American actor, singer, businessman, and television producer (b. 1917)
  1986   – John Curtis Gowan, American psychologist and academic (b. 1912)
1987 – Luis Federico Leloir, French-Argentinian physician and biochemist, Nobel Prize laureate (b. 1906)
  1987   – Yakov Borisovich Zel'dovich, Belarusian physicist, astronomer, and cosmologist (b. 1914)
1988 – Karl-Heinz Bürger, German colonel (b. 1904)
  1988   – Tata Giacobetti, Italian singer-songwriter (b. 1922)
1990 – Aaron Copland, American composer and conductor (b. 1900)
  1990   – Robert Cummings, American actor, director, and producer (b. 1908)
1993 – Pablo Escobar, Colombian drug lord (b. 1949)
1995 – Robertson Davies, Canadian author, playwright, and critic (b. 1913)
  1995   – Roxie Roker, American actress (b. 1929)
  1995   – Mária Telkes, Hungarian–American biophysicist and chemist (b. 1900)
1997 – Shirley Crabtree, English wrestler (b. 1930)
  1997   – Michael Hedges, American singer-songwriter and guitarist (b. 1953)
1999 – Charlie Byrd, American guitarist (b. 1925)
2000 – Gail Fisher, American actress (b. 1935)
2002 – Ivan Illich, Austrian priest and philosopher (b. 1926)
  2002   – Arno Peters, German cartographer and historian (b. 1916)
2003 – Alan Davidson, British soldier, historian, and author (b. 1924)
2004 – Alicia Markova, English ballerina and choreographer (b. 1910)
  2004   – Mona Van Duyn, American poet and academic (b. 1921)
2005 – William P. Lawrence, American admiral and pilot (b. 1930)
  2005   – Van Tuong Nguyen, Australian convicted drug trafficker (b. 1980)
2006 – Mariska Veres, Dutch singer (b. 1947)
2007 – Jennifer Alexander, Canadian-American ballerina and actress (b. 1972)
  2007   – Elizabeth Hardwick, American literary critic, novelist, and short story writer (b. 1916)
2008 – Odetta, American singer-songwriter, guitarist, and actress (b. 1930)
  2008   – Henry Molaison, American memory disorder patient (b. 1926)
  2008   – Edward Samuel Rogers, Canadian lawyer and businessman (b. 1933)
  2008   – Renato de Grandis, Italian composer, musicologist, and writer (b. 1927)
2009 – Foge Fazio, American football player and coach (b. 1938)
  2009   – Eric Woolfson, Scottish singer-songwriter, pianist, and producer (b. 1945)
2012 – Tom Hendry, Canadian playwright, co-founded the Manitoba Theatre Centre (b. 1929)
  2012   – Ehsan Naraghi, Iranian sociologist and author (b. 1926)
2013 – William Allain, American soldier and politician, 58th Governor of Mississippi (b. 1928)
  2013   – Jean-Claude Beton, Algerian-French engineer and businessman, founded Orangina (b. 1925)
  2013   – Marcelo Déda, Brazilian lawyer and politician (b. 1960)
  2013   – Junior Murvin, Jamaican singer-songwriter (b. 1946)
2014 – A. R. Antulay, Indian lawyer and politician, 8th Chief Minister of Maharashtra (b. 1929)
  2014   – Jean Béliveau, Canadian ice hockey player (b. 1931)
  2014   – Josie Cichockyj, English basketball player and coach (b. 1964)
  2014   – Bobby Keys, American saxophonist (b. 1943)
  2014   – Don Laws, American figure skater and coach (b. 1929)
2015 – Sandy Berger, American lawyer and politician, 19th United States National Security Advisor (b. 1945)
  2015   – Will McMillan, American actor, director, and producer (b. 1944)
  2015   – George T. Sakato, American soldier, Medal of Honor recipient (b. 1921)
2020 – Pat Patterson, American wrestler (b. 1941)

Holidays and observances
Armed Forces Day (Cuba)
Christian feast day:
Avitus of Rouen
Bibiana
Channing Moore Williams (Anglicanism)
Chromatius
Habakkuk (Eastern Orthodox)
December 2 (Eastern Orthodox liturgics)
International Day for the Abolition of Slavery (United Nations)
Lao National Day
National Day (United Arab Emirates)

References

External links

 BBC: On This Day
 
 Historical Events on December 2

Days of the year
December